Salkuni is a village in Bhatar CD block in Bardhaman Sadar North subdivision of Purba Bardhaman district in the state of West Bengal, India.

History
Census 2011 Salkuni Village Location Code or Village Code 319768. The village of Salkuni located in the Bhatar tehsil of Burdwan district in West Bengal, India.

Demographics
The total geographic area of village is 252.63 hectares. Salkuni features a total population of 1,740 peoples. There are about 402 houses in Salkuni village. Ratanpur is nearest Village to Kumarun which is approximately 2 km away.

Caste
In Salkuni village, most of the villagers are from Schedule Caste (SC). Schedule Caste (SC) constitutes 37.76% while Schedule Tribe (ST) were 6.67% of total population in Salkuni village.

Population and house data

Work
In Salun village out of total population, 449 were engaged in work activities. 50.11% of workers describe their work as Main Work (Employment or Earning more than 6 Months) while 49.89% were involved in Marginal activity providing livelihood for less than 6 months. Of 449 workers engaged in Main Work, 97 were cultivators (owner or co-owner) while 110 were Agricultural labourer.

Transport 

Healthcare
Nearest Rural Hospital at Bhatar (with 60 beds) is the main medical facility in Bhatar CD block. There are primary health centres

External links
 Map
 Ratanpur

References 

Villages in Purba Bardhaman district